Boris Novotný (born 23 July 1976) is a Slovak judoka.

Achievements

References

External links
 

1976 births
Living people
Slovak male judoka
Place of birth missing (living people)
21st-century Slovak people